Some large /8 blocks of IPv4 addresses, the former Class A network blocks, are assigned in whole to single organizations or related groups of organizations, either by the Internet Corporation for Assigned Names and Numbers (ICANN), through the Internet Assigned Numbers Authority (IANA), or a regional Internet registry.

Each /8 block contains 256 = 2 = 16,777,216 addresses, which covers the whole range of the last three delimited segments of an IP address.

As IPv4 address exhaustion has advanced to its final stages, some organizations, such as Stanford University, formerly using 36.0.0.0/8, have returned their allocated blocks (in this case to APNIC) to assist in the delay of the exhaustion date.

List of reserved /8 blocks

List of assigned /8 blocks to commercial organisations

List of assigned /8 blocks to the United States Department of Defense

List of assigned /8 blocks to the regional Internet registries 

The regional Internet registries (RIR) allocate IPs within a particular region of the world.

Note that this list may not include current assignments of /8 blocks to all regional or national Internet registries.

Original list of IPv4 assigned address blocks
The original list of IPv4 address blocks can be found in RFC 790 (J. B. Postel, September 1981).  In previous versions of the document, (RFC 776 (J. B. Postel, January 1981), RFC 750, (J. B. Postel, 26 September 1978)), network numbers were 8-bit numbers rather than the 32-bit numbers used in IPv4.  RFC 790 also added three networks not listed in RFC 776: 42.rrr.rrr.rrr, 43.rrr.rrr.rrr, and 44.rrr.rrr.rrr.

The relevant portion of RFC 790 is reproduced here with minor changes:

 000.rrr.rrr.rrr Reserved [JBP]
 001.rrr.rrr.rrr BBN-PR BBN Packet Radio Network [DCA2]
 002.rrr.rrr.rrr SF-PR-1 SF Packet Radio Network [JEM]
 003.rrr.rrr.rrr BBN-RCC BBN RCC Network [SGC]
 004.rrr.rrr.rrr SATNET Atlantic Satellite Network [DM11]
 005.rrr.rrr.rrr SILL-PR Ft. Sill Packet Radio Network[JEM]
 006.rrr.rrr.rrr SF-PR-2 SF Packet Radio Network [JEM]
 007.rrr.rrr.rrr CHAOS MIT CHAOS Network [MOON]
 008.rrr.rrr.rrr CLARKNET SATNET subnet for Clarksburg [DM11]
 009.rrr.rrr.rrr BRAGG-PR Ft. Bragg Packet Radio Net [JEM]
 010.rrr.rrr.rrr ARPANET ARPANET [VGC]
 011.rrr.rrr.rrr UCLNET University College London [PK]
 012.rrr.rrr.rrr CYCLADES CYCLADES [VGC]
 013.rrr.rrr.rrr Unassigned [JBP]
 014.rrr.rrr.rrr TELENET TELENET [VGC]
 015.rrr.rrr.rrr EPSS British Post Office EPSS [PK]
 016.rrr.rrr.rrr DATAPAC DATAPAC [VGC]
 017.rrr.rrr.rrr TRANSPAC TRANSPAC [VGC]
 018.rrr.rrr.rrr LCSNET MIT LCS Network [DDC2]
 019.rrr.rrr.rrr TYMNET TYMNET [VGC]
 020.rrr.rrr.rrr DC-PR D.C. Packet Radio Network [VGC]
 021.rrr.rrr.rrr EDN DCEC EDN [EC5]
 022.rrr.rrr.rrr DIALNET DIALNET [MRC]
 023.rrr.rrr.rrr MITRE MITRE Cablenet [APS]
 024.rrr.rrr.rrr BBN-LOCAL BBN Local Network [SGC]
 025.rrr.rrr.rrr RSRE-PPSN RSRE / PPSN [BD2]
 026.rrr.rrr.rrr AUTODIN-II AUTODIN II [EC5]
 027.rrr.rrr.rrr NOSC-LCCN NOSC / LCCN [KTP]
 028.rrr.rrr.rrr WIDEBAND Wide Band Satellite Network [CJW2]
 029.rrr.rrr.rrr DCN-COMSAT COMSAT Dist. Comp. Network [DLM1]
 030.rrr.rrr.rrr DCN-UCL UCL Dist. Comp. Network [PK]
 031.rrr.rrr.rrr BBN-SAT-TEST BBN SATNET Test Network [DM11]
 032.rrr.rrr.rrr UCL-CR1 UCL Cambridge Ring 1 [PK]
 033.rrr.rrr.rrr UCL-CR2 UCL Cambridge Ring 2 [PK]
 034.rrr.rrr.rrr MATNET Mobile Access Terminal Net [DM11]
 035.rrr.rrr.rrr NULL UCL/RSRE Null Network [BD2]
 036.rrr.rrr.rrr SU-NET Stanford University Ethernet [MRC]
 037.rrr.rrr.rrr DECNET Digital Equipment Network [DRL]
 038.rrr.rrr.rrr DECNET-TEST Test Digital Equipment Net [DRL]
 039.rrr.rrr.rrr SRINET SRI Local Network [GEOF]
 040.rrr.rrr.rrr CISLNET CISL Multics Network [CH2]
 041.rrr.rrr.rrr BBN-LN-TEST BBN Local Network Testbed [KTP]
 042.rrr.rrr.rrr S1NET LLL-S1-NET [EAK]
 043.rrr.rrr.rrr INTELPOST COMSAT INTELPOST [DLM1]
 044.rrr.rrr.rrr AMPRNET Amateur Radio Experiment Net [HM]

See also
 Classless Inter-Domain Routing (CIDR)
 List of countries by IPv4 address allocation

Notes

References
  The authoritative up-to-date list of IANA assignments.
 
 Historical IP address lists:
  First version of IANA table with historical notes via the Internet Archive Wayback Machine.
  Last version of IANA table with historical notes via the Internet Archive Wayback Machine.
 
 
 
 
 
 
 
 

Network addressing
IPv4
IPv4 address blocks